The Seventh-day Adventist Church is a major Christian denomination with a significant presence in Brazil with over 1,721,758 members as of June 30, 2020. The Seventh-day Adventist Church splits Brazil into eight Unions.

Sub Fields
Central Brazil Union Conference website
Central Sao Paulo Conference website
East Sao Paulo Conference website
Sao Paulo Conference website
Sao Paulo Valley Conference website
South Sao Paulo Conference website
Southeast Sao Paulo Conference website
Southwest Sao Paulo Conference website 
West Sao Paulo Conference website
East Brazil Union Mission website
Sergipe Mission website
Bahia Conference website 
Central Bahia Conference website 
North Bahia Conference website 
South Bahia Conference website 
Southwest Bahia Mission website 
North Brazil Union Mission website 
Maranhao Conference website 
Northeast Maranhao Mission
South Maranhao Mission website
North Para Conference website
South Para Conference website
West Para Mission website
Para-Amapa Mission website 
Northeast Brazil Union Mission website 
Ceara Conference website 
Alagoas Mission website
Pernambuco Conference website
Central Pernambuco Mission website
Piaui Mission website 
Northeast Brazil Mission website
Northwest Brazil Union Conference website
Amazonas-Roraima Conference website 
Central Amazon Conference  website
South Rondonia Conference  website
West Amazon Conference website
South Brazil Union Conference website 
Central Parana Conference website
North Parana Conference website
South Parana Conference website
West Parana Conference website
Rio Grande do Sul Conference website
Central Rio Grande do Sul Conference website
North Rio Grande do Sul Mission website
Santa Catarina Conference  website
North Santa Catarina Conference website
Southeast Brazil Union Conference website
Espirito Santo Conference website 
South Espirito Santo Conference website 
Rio de Janeiro Conference website
Rio Fluminense Conference website
South Rio Conference website
Central Minas Conference website
East Minas Conference website
North Minas Mission  website
South Minas Conference website
West Central Brazil Union Mission website
Central Planalto Conference website
Central Brazil Conference website
Mato Grosso Conference website
South Mato Grosso Conference website
Tocantins Mission. website

Education facilities
The Seventh-day Adventist Church operates 124 secondary schools in Brazil. The church also operates five schools of higher education named: Amazonia Adventist College; Bahia Adventist College; Brazil Adventist University; Minas Gerais Adventist College & Parana Adventist College.

Medical facilities
The Seventh-day Adventist Church operates seven hospitals & two clinics in Brazil named: Adventist Natural Life Clinic; Belem Adventist Hospital; Manaus Adventist Hospital; Penfigo Adventist Hospital; Sao Paulo Adventist Hospital; Silvestre Adventist Hospital; Silvestre Adventist Hospital - Itaborai; Curitiba Adventist Clinic & Porto Alegre Adventist Clinic.

History

See also
Seventh-day Adventist Church in Canada 
Seventh-day Adventist Church in the People's Republic of China
Seventh-day Adventist Church in Colombia 
Seventh-day Adventist Church in Cuba
Seventh-day Adventist Church in India 
Italian Union of Seventh-day Adventist Churches
Seventh-day Adventist Church in Ghana 
New Zealand Pacific Union Conference of Seventh-day Adventists
Seventh-day Adventist Church in Nigeria 
Adventism in Norway
Romanian Union Conference of Seventh-day Adventists
Seventh-day Adventist Church in Sweden 
Seventh-day Adventist Church in Thailand 
Seventh-day Adventist Church in Tonga
Seventh-day Adventists in Turks and Caicos Islands

References

Protestantism in Brazil
Brazil
History of the Seventh-day Adventist Church
Seventh-day Adventist Church in South America